Glossaulax petiveriana is a species of sea snail, a marine gastropod mollusk in the family Naticidae, the moon snails. The scientific name of this species was first published in 1843 by César Auguste Récluz.

References

External links
 Gastropod.com entry 
 gbif info 

Naticidae
Gastropods described in 1843